Dome Mountain is a mountain located in the north east of New South Wales, Australia. The closest large town is Kyogle. The mountain is within the World Heritage listed Toonumbar National Park. Sub tropical rainforest nearby contains many species of plants, including the black booyong and pigeonberry ash.

See also

List of mountains of New South Wales

References

Dome Mountain (New South Wales)
Forests of New South Wales
Northern Rivers